Mato Grubisic (born 25 June 1982) is a Norwegian football striker who plays for Valdres FK.

Career
In the Norwegian Second Division season of 2003, Grubisic scored 19 goals for his club Skjetten SK. He received transfer offers from Kongsvinger IL and Pors Grenland, but opted to stay in Skjetten. However, he trained with Lillestrøm SK during the winter. Already a few months later he signed for Lillestrøm. He got three Norwegian Premier League games in 2004, and one in 2005, but without scoring. In the second half of 2005 he was loaned out to Ullensaker/Kisa IL. After the season the loan was made permanent.

Ahead of the 2007 season he returned to Skjetten SK, moving from the third to the fourth tier of Norwegian football. He was offered a job in addition to a part-time football contract. Skjetten cruised through the season, and was promoted with ease, winning the playoff matches against Grüner IL 14–0 on aggregate. Grubisic scored 45 league goals during the 2007 season. In the Norwegian Second Division 2008 he scored 20 goals as Skjetten retained its place in the league. Ahead of the 2009 season, however, he signed for Valdres FK, citing that he needed a "change of environment".

References

1982 births
Living people
Norwegian footballers
Skjetten SK players
Lillestrøm SK players
Ullensaker/Kisa IL players
People from Akershus
Norwegian people of Croatian descent
Association football forwards
Sportspeople from Viken (county)